is a Japanese manga series written and illustrated by Tsukasa Hojo. It was serialized in Weekly Shōnen Jump from 1981 to 1985, and collected into 18 tankōbon by Shueisha. The story follows the adventures of the three Kisugi sisters — Hitomi, Rui and Ai, who are formidable art thieves trying to collect all the works belonging to their missing father.

The manga was made into a televised anime series originally broadcast in 1983 to 1984 on Nippon TV, with a second season ending in 1985. It has also received two live-action adaptations; a TV movie in 1988 and a theatrical film in 1997. A crossover ONA with Lupin III that TMS Entertainment produced, premiered on Amazon Prime Video in 2023.

Cat's Eye is one of Weekly Shōnen Jump's best-selling manga series of all time, with over 20 million copies sold, making it one of the best-selling manga series.

Plot
Hitomi Kisugi, along with her older sister Rui and her younger sister Ai, run a café called "Cat's Eye" in Tokyo. The sisters lead a double life as a trio of highly skilled art thieves, stealing works of art which primarily belonged to their long-missing father, Michael Heinz, who was a famous art collector during the Nazi regime. Hitomi's fiancé is Toshio Utsumi, a clumsy young police officer who is investigating the Cat's Eye case. Despite being a frequent visitor to the café he is unaware of the double life of the girls. Hitomi regularly informs the police in advance about her next job using a signature "Cat's Eye" calling card, and then uses Toshio's research about the security surrounding the target to help plan the job.

At the end of the series, Heinz leaves a note for his daughters stating that he cannot reveal himself yet because the mafia may kill him, but he may appear in five years' time. However, the "Heinz" turns out to be the sisters' treacherous uncle Cranaff, who betrayed Michael years earlier. After losing a final bet to Cat's Eye, Cranaff decides to atone for his sin by setting fire to the museum, killing himself. Hitomi eventually admits to Toshio that she is part of Cat's Eye and flees before he can arrest her. Toshio vows to track her down, attempting to "arrest" Hitomi at the airport with a wedding ring. He resigns from the police force and travels to America to find Hitomi, but finds that she has lost her memory due to viral meningitis. Toshio spends time with her until her memories come back, and the two rekindle their relationship.

Characters

Hitomi is the main protagonist of the series. Second daughter of Michael Heinz, Hitomi is usually the one who actually commits the heists, and is hence uniquely referred to as the Cat's Eye. Like Rui, she is an accomplished athlete and well versed in a number of disciplines and skills ranging from horseback riding to safe cracking. She is a skilled gymnast and is able to perform complex acrobatic moves with ease and grace. She is able to escape most restraints and handcuffs with minimal effort, and it is inferred that she is ambidextrous as well as double jointed. She is a skilled martial artist with proficiency in a number of disciplines, most notably judo, boxing and karate, and also has degrees in kendo and aikido. Hitomi is very charming, clever, sweet, sisterly, loyal, cunning, flirtatious, caring and kind-hearted.
Like Rui, Hitomi is also able to disguise her appearance effortlessly and can speak several other languages.

Rui is the second protagonist of the series. Hitomi's elegant and fashionable older sister, Rui is the leader and brain of the “Cat's Eye” group and the one who usually outlines strategies and plans the heists. With model good looks, worldly sophistication, and a razor-sharp intelligence she is able to handle almost any situation. She is extremely athletic and proficient in a great number of activities and skills including car racing, hang gliding, parachuting, helicopter piloting, motorcycle riding, roller skating, skateboarding, martial arts, electronics, handguns and scuba diving. She is a skilled actress and is able to disguise her appearance effortlessly. She is also fluent in a number of languages including English, French and German; she can also read lips accurately.
Rui acts as the mother figure for her sisters and is very protective of them. She is the only sister who has any lasting memory of their parents.

Ai is the third protagonist of the series. As baby sister of the trio, Ai has a spunky, tomboyish personality and demeanor, and has a genius-level I.Q. and is particularly adept in mechanics, computer programming and engineering. She has built a wide array of gadgets to help her sisters in their heists. A typical teenager, she seems to be preoccupied a lot and dreams of falling in love. Being a high school girl, she also has a pet tabby kitten called "Tiger".
While not as skilled as her sisters, Ai has none-the-less mastered a number of skills and is regularly the one who operates the get-away vehicles for the heists, including helicopters, gyrocopters, trucks, motorcycles, cars and mini-planes. Her greatest weakness lies in the fact she is physically the weakest of the three siblings (evident in the anime when she tried to suplex a wrestler, only to have the maneuver backfire on her), but in exchange, she is also the most agile. 

The male protagonist of the series, Toshio is Hitomi's high school sweetheart. Toshio always dreamed of being a police detective even when in high school, and upon graduation from Academy was assigned to the  District Police Station in the heart of Tokyo. While Toshio has wanted to marry Hitomi, he has vowed not to until he has captured the Cat's Eye (he has, however, made the first step and proposed to her).
While a bit clumsy, very gullible, unlucky and not very good at finding clues, his dogged determination and unyielding persistence has impressed his supervisors. He is, however, very stubborn and gets into verbal fights with his Chief constantly. Toshio doesn't carry a gun and prefers to use his wits and fists to contend with criminals. He has a weakness for beautiful women (especially blondes) and constantly makes Hitomi jealous.

Toshio's demanding Section Chief, who oversees the Detective's Division of the Inunaki Precinct. Nothing really is known about him, even his full name is never disclosed. He is constantly at odds with Toshio over his handling of the Cat's Eye investigation, and scolds Toshio at every opportunity.

A special investigator sent in from Tokyo Police HQ to assist in the Cat's Eye investigations. Asatani has a very shrewd intellect and has a very cunning personality, and is considered an elite officer of the Tokyo Metropolitan Police Department. She is an expert markswoman (won the All-Japan Air Pistol Championships) and is proficient in several martial art forms, she's a 4th-degree black belt in karate and 2nd degree black belt in judo, making her more than a match for Hitomi. She is also quite a beauty, even being crowned a beauty queen during one of Cat's Eye cases. She is one of the first person to suspect Hitomi as the true identity of Cat's Eye, but is never able to find definitive proof. Her main weakness is that she must wear prescription glasses all the time, as she is practically blind without them.
While never really elaborated in the TV series, in the manga she is said to have a secret crush on Toshio, much to the chagrin of Hitomi.

An artistic wunderkind in Germany during the 1930s, Heinz was so gifted that by age 10 he already began composing the beginnings of his impressive art collection, which contains not only elaborate paintings and lithographs but also one-of-a-kind jewelry, sculptures and metal works. Heinz's was even able to create exquisite musical instruments. As such Heinz's works were highly sought among art collectors and galleries and many would pay exorbitant amounts to own one of his works.
When the Nazi party began taking over Germany, Heinz fled the country for fear of political/artistic suppression. Traveling around the world, he eventually settled down in Japan, where he met and married a young Japanese woman. After the birth of their third daughter, Heinz travelled to the United States, where he disappeared under mysterious circumstances. His vast and priceless collection of art works were soon auctioned off and dispersed to art dealers around the world. Eventually, many pieces found their way to Japan in the hands of various private deals (many with criminal ties). In subsequent years, the collection were stolen piece by piece, regardless of heavy security, by a trio of thieves calling themselves "Cat's Eye", who were actually Heinz's grown-up daughters seeking clues to his whereabouts and hoping to get his attention to get him out of hiding.
Rui, Hitomi and Ai find that their father is in the U.S. and they go there to track him down. It is eventually revealed that Michael was actually betrayed and forced into exile by his jealous twin brother Cranaff (クラナッフ), who then stole Michael's identity for profit with the syndicate. The revelation ends the sisters' hope of finding their father through recollecting his art work, and the Cat's Eye cease operations afterwards.

Trusted friend and confidant to the three sisters, a very good friend of Heinz and his wife. Nagaishi provides detailed information for Cat's Eye's heists and also helps them acquire any hardware and/or other sophisticated equipment that they may need that Ai cannot provide. His background is a mystery but he may have been a member of the Armed Forces as he has some military expertise.

A girl from Ai's school who took a picture of Hitomi while shooting photographs of the moon with a telelens. She later boasted to one of her friends that she had taken pictures of Cat's Eye, sending Ai (who overheard the conversation) panicking. Kasumi became determined to reveal Cat's Eye's true nature and planned to go to the place Cat's Eye's next target with her camera. She managed to get a good look at the backside of Cat's Eye and thought that Hitomi fits that picture very well, and became only more convinced when she sees Hitomi playing around with some punks in the park. Asatani has noticed this too and takes Kazumi into her confidence. With a story about her dad being away (that it is unsafe for a young girl to be alone at home), Kazumi infiltrates into the Kisugi's home and asks Ai to let her stay the night. However, the Kisugi sisters managed to cunningly circumvent Kazumi's suspicion by appearing that Hitomi was still at home during the Cat's Eye mission.

Media

Manga

Tsukasa Hojo's Cat's Eye was serialized in Weekly Shōnen Jump from September 14, 1981, to October 15, 1984, (an additional chapter was published on January 22, 1985) with the chapters collected into 18 tankōbon by Shueisha. It was later re-released as 10 aizōban in 1994, 10 bunkoban in 1996, and 15 kanzenban between 2005–2006. The kanzenban release was published by Tokuma Shoten, instead of Shueisha.

The manga was also released domestically in several foreign countries, such as Italy by Star Comics, in France by Tonkam, and in Malaysia by Comics House.

A remake manga of the series drawn by Shingo Asai, also titled , began publication in the debut issue of Tokuma Shoten's Monthly Comic Zenon anthology, which was published on October 25, 2010. It was serialized until January 25, 2014, which comprises eight tankōbon volumes.

Other books
In December 1996, Cat's Eye novel by Hideo Takayashiki was published.

On March 22, 2000,  was published. It was written by Tsukasa Hōjō with Digital Work by Futoshi Nagata.

Anime

Cat's Eye was adapted into an anime series by Tokyo Movie Shinsha and directed by Yoshio Takeuchi. 36 episodes were broadcast between July 11, 1983 until March 26, 1984. A second series was later produced that ran for 37 episodes from October 8, 1984 until July 8, 1985.

In 2007, ImaginAsian broadcast the first season of the first anime on ImaginAsian TV, and then gave the first half of the series its first North American home video release. Right Stuf Inc. announced that they licensed the entire series in 2013 and will release it on DVD under their Nozomi label. The entire anime series was released in North American on two DVDs in July and November 2014. In April 2019, it was announced that the Right Stuf license has expired. On December 13, 2021 Discotek Media announced via their Discotek Day Announcement stream on Twitch they had acquired the rights to the anime series for release on Blu-ray in April of 2022.

In 2019, the Kisugi sisters appeared in the animated film City Hunter the Movie: Shinjuku Private Eyes as a crossover. Chika Sakamoto and Keiko Toda reprised their respective roles from the 80s anime series as Ai and Hitomi, with Toda also voicing Rui due to the 2018 death of Toshiko Fujita.

On September 22, 2022, TMS Entertainment announced a CGI-based crossover anime with Lupin III: Lupin III vs Cat's Eye. The anime is directed by Kōbun Shizuno and Hiroyuki Seshita, with Keisuke Ide serving as assistant director, Shūji Kuzuhara is writing the scripts, Yuji Ohno and Kazuo Otani will compose the music, and Haruhisa Nakata and Junko Yamanaka are designing the characters. Keiko Toda will reprise her role Hitomi Kisugi. On December 6, 2022, it was revealed that Chika Sakamoto and Yoshito Yasuhara would return as respective roles as Ai and Toshio, with Rika Fukami taking over the role of Rui. The anime premiered on Amazon Prime Video as a worldwide exclusive on January 27, 2023.

Live-action film
On August 27, 1997, the live-action movie adaption Cat's Eye was released. The film is directed by Kaizo Hayashi and starring Yuki Uchida and Norika Fujiwara. A behind-the-scenes video was created for the movie, called Cat's Eye Secret.

Live-action drama
On March 9, 2023, the Le Parisien newspaper reported that a French live-action drama version of the series is being produced by TF1 with considerations to release the series overseas.

Reception
As of July 2012, Cat's Eye had over 20 million copies in circulation.

See also
"Cat's Eye" (song)

References

External links
 

 
1981 manga
1983 anime television series debuts
2023 anime ONAs
Action anime and manga
Crime in anime and manga
Discotek Media
Mystery anime and manga
Nippon TV original programming
Seinen manga
Shōnen manga
Shueisha manga
TMS Entertainment
Tokuma Shoten manga